Men's World Day was observed in Austria in the first week of November annually in the years 2000–04. It was conceived by author George Kindel and inaugurated in November 2000. A central motivation for Kindel was his understanding that "the testosterone influenced brain of men" is the main reason for men's violent nature, and why he also believed that women would never be capable of violence and brutality. Due to the male propensity for violence Kindel proposed that Men's World Day not be conceived as a day to celebrate men but rather a day of introspection and self-criticism. He also wanted to show that there are some males who have had a positive, nonviolent influence on our world and to award them as role models.

Mikhail Gorbachev offered to act as co-founder and president of the event after an invitation by Kindel who had described it to him as a 'men's health' initiative. Men's World Day consisted primarily of a world awards event to recognise and honour men who exemplify the best attributes of mankind. Men recognized and awarded at this event include Michael Jackson, Michael Douglas, Morgan Freeman, Plácido Domingo, Christopher Reeve, the Bee Gees, Yusuf Islam aka Cat Stevens, Sir Paul McCartney, Sir Richard Branson, Steven Spielberg, Luciano Pavarotti, Christian Barnard and Ted Turner.

Men's World Day has been promoted as a world event but has not been officially celebrated by any other countries except Austria, and Germany in 2003 It was recognized by the United Nations in Vienna and by the Gorbachev Foundation who jointly organized the annual event for four years before it was terminated and replaced with a new gender neutral celebration.

Due to the perceived inequity of having a day devoted to honouring males alone, the 'Men's World Day' event was terminated and replaced with a new gender neutral event named 'The World Awards' which now permanently includes the honouring and awarding of women. The World Awards continues to be held in Austria and consists of two awards events; the primary event is now the Women's World Awards, which honours women exclusively and has become the world's most important honors for women, annually reaching more than 500 million people around the globe via television, print media, radio and the Internet. The 2009 Women's World Awards television special was broadcast in 51 countries of the world, more than 400 journalists, photographers and 31 TV teams from around the globe. The second event is the Save The World Awards which recognizes and awards equal numbers of women and men who have contributed to a sustainable, green and livable future for our planet and its people. Women who have received awards at the Women's World Awards include Monica Bellucci for acting, Anastacia for singing, Bar Refaeli for style, Angela Missoni for fashion, Kelly Clarkson for entertainment, Esther Mujawayo-Keiner for social activities, Elle Macpherson for her modelling career, and Oprah Winfrey. The World Awards emphasises that the 20th century was marked by many outstanding women who also strived for equality, freedom and who all stood for peace and tolerance as well as civil rights. Due to their contributions the general situation for women and society at large has continually improved. Yet, there is still a long way to go because discrimination and violence, say organizers, regrettably remain part of the day-to-day reality of women – at the workplace, in everyday life, and that many are still considered "second class citizens" with no rights at all, a reality that provides the backdrop for the need to highlight women's achievements.

See also
International Men's Health Week
Women's World Awards up to 2009
Men's Health Clinic of Zimbabwe
International Men's Day, a day honouring men alone

References

External links
The World Awards
Gorbachev Foundation
Всемирный день мужчин (Men's World Day)
Deutsche Gesellschaft für Mann und Gesundheit: Weltmännertag 2014
Die Presse.com Weltmännertag: Ein Tag mit vielen Missverständnissen

November observances
Recurring events established in 2000
Men